February 2013

See also

References

 02
February 2013 events in the United States